is a Japanese politician who serves as minister of finance since October 2021. He is serving in the House of Representatives as a member of the Liberal Democratic Party.

Background and career
A native of Tokyo Metropolis and graduate of Waseda University, Suzuki and his wife belong to political dynasties: former Prime Ministers Zenkō Suzuki and Tarō Asō are respectively his father and his brother-in-law; his wife Chikako is related to Heikichi Ogawa and Prime Minister Kiichi Miyazawa. Suzuki was elected for the first time in 1990. He served as Minister of the Environment from 2002 to 2003 under Jun'ichirō Koizumi.

Suzuki has been appointed as Minister for the Tokyo Olympic and Paralympic Games twice.

Other activities
 European Bank for Reconstruction and Development (EBRD), Ex-Officio Member of the Board of Governors (since 2021)
 Inter-American Development Bank (IDB), Ex-Officio Member of the Board of Governors (since 2021)

Political positions
Suzuki is affiliated to the openly revisionist lobby Nippon Kaigi, and is a member of the Shikōkai faction of the LDP. He gave the following answers to the questionnaire submitted by Mainichi to parliamentarians in 2012:
in favor of the revision of the Constitution
in favor of the right of collective self-defense (revision of Article 9)
against the reform of the national legislature (unicameral instead of bicameral)
in favor of reactivating nuclear power plants
against the goal of zero nuclear power by 2030s
in favor of the relocation of Marine Corps Air Station Futenma (Okinawa)
in favor of evaluating the purchase of Senkaku Islands by the Government
in favor of a strong attitude versus China
against the participation of Japan to the Trans-Pacific Partnership
against a nuclear-armed Japan
against the reform of the Imperial Household that would allow women to retain their Imperial status even after marriage

Personal life
Tarō Asō is Suzuki's brother-in-law.

References

External links
 
 Suzuki Shunichi profile, jimin.jp; accessed 18 June 2015.

1953 births
Living people
People from Tokyo
Waseda University alumni
Members of the House of Representatives (Japan)
Members of Nippon Kaigi
Environment ministers of Japan
Ministers of Finance of Japan
Children of prime ministers of Japan
Liberal Democratic Party (Japan) politicians
21st-century Japanese politicians